Alfredo Anderson Salazar (born October 31, 1978) is a Panamanian former football player.

Club career
He played in the Argentinos Juniors youth teams and for Plaza Amador before a spell with United Soccer League side Charleston Battery. In summer 1999 he joined Árabe Unido but also had another spell abroad alongside compatriot Jorge Dely Valdes with Omiya Ardija in Japan.

International career
Anderson made his debut for Panama in a June 2000 friendly match against Venezuela and has earned a total of 12 caps, scoring 2 goals. He represented his country in 2 FIFA World Cup qualification matches and played at the 2001 UNCAF Nations Cup.

His final international was an August 2001 friendly against Brazil.

International goals
Scores and results list Panama's goal tally first.

References

External links

 
 Omiya Ardija

1978 births
Living people
Sportspeople from Colón, Panama
Association football forwards
Panamanian footballers
Panamanian expatriate footballers
Panama international footballers
2001 UNCAF Nations Cup players
C.D. Plaza Amador players
Charleston Battery players
C.D. Árabe Unido players
Omiya Ardija players
Panamanian expatriate sportspeople in the United States
Panamanian expatriate sportspeople in Japan
Expatriate soccer players in the United States
Expatriate footballers in Japan
J2 League players
A-League (1995–2004) players
Central American Games silver medalists for Panama
Central American Games medalists in football